Anti-imperialism solidarity day is observed on 1 January every year in Bangladesh by Communist Party of Bangladesh, Workers Party of Bangladesh, Socialist Party of Bangladesh, and many other left leaning organizations.

Background
Bangladesh became an independent country on 1971 after the Bangladesh Liberation war. Students were a vital force in struggle and war of liberation— mainly they were the people who dreamed of building a free, equitable, secular society and they had sacrificed a lot for chanting  the slogans for a free country and world in highly polarized world in that time. At the end of 1972 students made mobilizations against the attack of United States of America on Vietnam like it was being done by the students all over the world. 1 January was decided to be observed as Vietnam Solidarity day.

History
After a students’ gathering at Bat-tala students were moving in rally to give a memorandum to the American Embassy on 1 January 1973. The police tried to disperse the protesters. The police fired on the rally. Two died on the spot and many students were seriously injured. Bangladesh Students Union activists Matiul Islam and Mirza Kaderul Islam died in the police firing. The incident instigated the students into starting another movement was made against this brutality. On pressure government sought apology and accepted demands of the students later in which recognizing Revolutionary Government of Vietnam was included as a point of demands. And for this movement and martyrdom Bangladesh became the first South Asian and second Asian country to recognize Provisional Revolutionary Government of the Republic of South Vietnam on 11 February 1973.

Legacy
On 4 September 2008 a memorial sculpture in memory of Matiul Islam and Mirza Kader was inaugurated at the National Press Club. The day of the firing is marked every year by left leaning organizations in Bangladesh.

References

Anti-imperialism in Asia
Protests in Bangladesh